The Trumbull was a short-lived make of cyclecar manufactured in Bridgeport, Connecticut by the Trumbull Motorcar Company. About 2000 Trumbull cars were produced between 1913 and 1915. After the death of Isaac Trumbull on the RMS Lusitania, the company ceased production.

Company history
The origins of the Trumbull Motor Company lie in a car designed in 1912 by Harry Stoops and intended to be produced by the Americal Cyclecar Company, but the design was acquired in 1913 by Alexander and Isaac Trumbull before any cars had been manufactured. In 1915 the chain-drive system was replaced by a more familiar direct drive through a gearbox.

A total of approximately 2000 Trumbull cars were produced, of which three quarters were exported, mainly to Europe and Australia. The sole importer in England was A.I. Greenwood of Leeds and in 1914 the roadster retailed at £105 in England and $425 in the US. The New York Police Department were also early users of Trumbulls, with upwards of 20 vehicles.

Rapid collapse
With production ramped up to 300 cars per month, on 1 May 1915 company president Isaac Trumbull boarded the RMS Lusitania for a visit to Europe. Also on board were 20 Trumbull cars and expectations were buoyant with sales of up to 300 cars being anticipated as a result of the trip. On 7 May the Lusitania was torpedoed off the coast of Ireland, with Issac Trumbull being one of more than 1000 lives lost. Almost immediately Trumbull's brothers vowed to convert manufacturing effort to munitions for use against World War 1 Germany, and in November of that year the Trumbull Motor Company was wound up.

References

Defunct motor vehicle manufacturers of the United States
1910s cars
Vehicle manufacturing companies established in 1914
Vehicle manufacturing companies disestablished in 1915
1914 establishments in Connecticut
1915 disestablishments in Connecticut
Defunct manufacturing companies based in Connecticut